All That's Dead is the twelfth novel in the bestselling  Logan 'Lazarus' McRae series written by Stuart MacBride.

Plot
An Englishman, who lectures at Aberdeen University, goes missing, with only spattered blood stains to indicate what might have happened. He was vociferous in his Unionism (especially on social media) and it is thought by Police Scotland that the Alt-Nats (Alternative Nationalists) have kidnapped him. Then at least two others go missing too. Amidst all this, Detective Inspector Logan McRae is back at work after having had a year off on sick leave (on account of his wounds from the last story The Blood Road). McRae, who is still in Professional Standards, is seconded to the investigation into the disappearances when it is revealed that the detective inspector leading the investigation, was in a Nationalist terror group when he was sixteen.

Reception
MacBride acknowledged that the novel had an obvious theme; that of Scotland's Independence and the fight between the Nationalists and the Unionists. MacBride stated his thoughts on the matter, saying 

Barry Forshaw, writing in the "Financial Times", commented on the Scottish Independence theme on the book and stated "...while the delivery of such elements in All That’s Dead may seem less compulsively nasty than previous outings for his rough-edged Aberdeen copper Logan McRae, readers should not be lured into a false sense of security."

Louise Fairbairn, writing in "The Scotsman", said "After last year’s superlative The Blood Road, I wondered what Stuart MacBride was going to do next. I needn’t have worried – All That’s Dead is a much slower burn, and a very different kind of case for Logan McRae, but it’s a satisfying read, and a hugely thoughtful novel to boot."

David Knights, writing in the Keighley News was very positive about the novel saying that the novel "is up there with the best of Logan’s previous outings."

On its first week of release, All That's Dead debuted at number 2 on the hardback book chart.

References

2019 British novels
Novels set in Aberdeenshire
Novels by Stuart MacBride
HarperCollins books